Valeria Rusu (born 31 December 1997) is a Moldovan footballer who plays as a defender for the Moldova women's national team.

See also
List of Moldova women's international footballers

References

1997 births
Living people
Women's association football defenders
Moldovan women's footballers
Moldova women's international footballers
FC Noroc Nimoreni players